Hockey Ireland, previously known as the Irish Hockey Association, is the governing body for field hockey in both the Republic of Ireland and Northern Ireland. It is responsible for organising both the Ireland men's national field hockey team and the Ireland women's national field hockey team, as well as national leagues and cup competitions. Hockey Ireland is mainly funded through grants as well as small contributions from Sport Ireland, Sport Northern Ireland and the Olympic Council of Ireland. In 2013 Hockey Ireland became a limited company. Approximately 168 clubs and 280 schools are affiliated to Hockey Ireland.

History
The Irish Hockey Union was founded on 6 February 1893, following a meeting at the Wicklow Hotel. The men's Irish Senior Cup was first played for in 1893–94, making it the oldest field hockey cup competition in the world. The men's Irish Junior Cup was first played for in 1894–95. On 26 January 1895 the Ireland men's national field hockey team played in the  first ever international field hockey match when they defeated Wales 3–0 in Rhyl. The Irish Ladies Hockey Union was established in 1894, following a meeting at Alexandra College. In March 1896 they hosted the first ever women's international field hockey match when the Ireland women's national field hockey team defeated England 2–0 at Alexandra College. Ireland joined the International Hockey Federation in 1950. The two unions merged in May 2000 to form the Irish Hockey Association. The merger came about after the International Hockey Federation declared in 1998 that each national member must be governed by just one organisation.

National teams
 Ireland men's national field hockey team
 Ireland women's national field hockey team

Men's competitions
 Men's Irish Hockey League
 Irish Senior Cup
 Irish Junior Cup

Women's competitions
 Women's Irish Hockey League
 Irish Senior Cup
 Irish Junior Cup

Affiliated bodies
 Irish Hockey Umpires Association
 Irish Universities Hockey Association
 Connacht Hockey
 Leinster Hockey Association
 Munster Hockey
 Ulster Hockey Union

References

External links
 

Ireland
1893 establishments in Ireland
Hockey
 
Sports organizations established in 1893